Michel Boivin is a French historian and anthropologist who specializes in South Asia. Trained in contemporary history, Islamic studies and ethnology, he is currently Director of Research at the Centre national de la recherche scientifique (CNRS: French National Center for Scientific Research) and a member of the CEIAS (Center for South Asian Studies) at the School for Advanced Studies in the Social Sciences (EHESS). He had taught at the Université de Savoie Mont Blanc, at Sciences Po Lyon, as well as at The Catholic University of Lyon. He is co-directing three seminars at the EHESS: “History and Anthropology of the Muslim Societies of South Asia”, “Authority and Politics in the Sufism of South and Central Asia”, and "Material Culture and devotion among the Shia societies". In addition, he contributes to the organization of two CEIAS research groups: “Vernacular Cultures and New Muslim Elites,” with Julien Levesque, and “Gujarati and Sindhi Studies: Societies, Languages and Cultures,” with Pierre Lachaier.

Biography 
After studying at Chambéry high school with an emphasis in the humanities, Michel Boivin became an expert on the Modern history of the Muslim world. He holds a DEA in Arabic and Islamic studies from the Université Lyon 2, and obtained a doctorat in Oriental Languages, Civilizations and Societies from the Université Paris 3-Sorbonne Nouvelle on Isma’ilian Shi’ism and Modernity in Sultân Muhammad Shâh Aghâ Khân (1877-1957), and then an habilitation thesis in ethnology from the Université Paris Ouest-Nanterre, on the topic of Shi’ism, Sufism and Social dynamics in Contemporary Sindh (19th century-20th century).
Michel Boivin is specialized in the study of the contemporary history and historical anthropology of Muslim communities in India and Pakistan during the colonial period, and since independence was obtained. After having devoted several years to the study of the Isma’ilians of these regions, he shifted his focus to Sufi groups. He directs a research team on “History and Sufism in the Indus Valley” at the CEIAS (EHESS-CNRS). From 2008 to 2011, this team has worked on an interdisciplinary and international project centered on the Sufi site of Sehwan Sharif. This mid-size city located in the southern Province of Pakistan called Sindh is where the tomb of the Sufi saint Lal Shahbaz Qalandar (d. 1274) is located. This sanctuary has become a site of pilgrimage where ecstatic dance practices take place. In addition, it is also an ecumenical center, as Hindus still play an important part in the rituals. Finally, Sehwan Sharif is a gathering place for gyrovague renouncers, used to be called “qalandars” and are now most often referred to as “malangs.”

One of his most recent research interests is in “Hindu Sufism” in Pakistan and India. To start out, Michel Boivin retraced the migratory paths of Sindhi Hindus, then researched their Sufi rituals in order to evaluate the extent to which they had to change to adapt to their new environment. In parallel, he has begun work on collecting the publications and manuscripts on Sufism in the Sindhi language. Despite his emphasis on historical anthropology, Michel Boivin continues to work on the appearance of new forms of knowledge in the 19th century. He is particularly interested in the production of a new culture in the Sindh province as a result of interaction between British colonial rule, the emergence of new elites and the objectification of Sufism. His work is therefore to be understood as a continuation of postcolonial studies, as he is engaged in reconstructing the evolution of the “Sufi culture of Sindh” based on archival work carried out in the Indian sub-continent and in Europe. During the last years, he used to employ iconography as a meaningful data to fill gaps resulting from the lack of written sources.

Michel Boivin teaches Historical Anthropology of South Asia at EHESS, Paris, with a focus on the Sindhicate area. He created in 2008 the Mission Interdisciplinaire Française du Sindh (MIFS) and signed an MOU with the department of Antiquities, Government of Sindh. The same year, an electronic newsletter was launched. In 2010, the MIFS became a register NGO (Association Loi 1901) in France. In 2011, Michel Boivin started the Centre for Social Science in Karachi (CSSK), with an MOU with the Alliance Française de Karachi which was hosting the centre. The same year, he funded the CSSK Series with OUP Pakistan. The CSSK organizes academic events and in 2015, it became a register NGO (Association Loi 1901) under French law. The CSSK organizes conferences, exhibitions, as well as training in Social Sciences for students, which are followed by field trips in Sindh.   Beyond supervising PhD students at EHESS, he is also an external examiner at the University of Karachi and the University of Sindh. As director of CSSK, he signed a MOU with N. E. D. University, Department of Architecture and Planning, Karachi in 2017. This MOU wished to reinforce the cooperation between the CEIAS and the N. E. D. University for the new project Michel Boivin had launched in 2016: the Uderolal Research Project (ULRP). Throughout this new ongoing project, the aim is to devote a multidisciplinary approach to the study of a sacred figure named Jhulelal, as well as with many other names, knowing it is worshipped both in Pakistan and in India, mostly by Sindhi speaking populations.

In 2011, Michel Boivin was nominated as member of the National Committee of CNRS, section 38 Ethnology, Anthropology and Sociology of Religions. In 2016, he was elected member in the same committee for a tenure of five years. In 2017, Michel Boivin was elected Director of the Centre for South Asian Studies (CNRS-EHESS), with three co-directors, and his tenure started on January 1, 2019, for five years.

Works

Books 
 
 
 
 
 
 
 
 
 
 
 
 
 Michel Boivin with Rémy Delage (eds) (2016), Devotional Islam in South Asia. Shrines, journeys and wanderers, New York and Oxon, Routledge.
 Michel Boivin, Matthew Cook and Julien Levesque (2017), Discovering Sindh’s Past. Selections from the Journal of the Sind Historical Society, 1934–1948, Edited by, Karachi, Oxford University Press.
 Boivin, Michel (2019).The Hindu Sufis of South Asia. Partition, Shrine Culture and the Sindhis of India, London, I. B. Tauris.
Forthcoming, The Sufi Paradigm and the Makings of Vernacular Knowledge in Colonial India: The Case of Sindh (1851-1929).

Forthcoming, with Manoël Pénicaud, Khwaja Khidr from the Middle East to South Asia: A Preliminary Survey of Multireligious Figure.

Chapters and papers 
 «Khwaja Khiẓr et le Sindhu (Indus) : archéologie d’une figure sacrée du Sindh à identités multiples », in Sur les chemins d’Onagre. Histoire et archéologie orientales. Hommage à Monik Kervran, édité par Claire Hardy-Guilbert, Hélène Renel, Axelle Rougeulle et Eric Vallet, Oxford, Archaeopress Publishing Ltd, 2018, pp. 3–14. 
 and Bhavna Rajpal, 2018, “From Udero Lal in Sindh to Ulhasnagar in Maharashtra: Partition and Memories Across Borders in the Tradition of Jhulelal », in Churnjeet Mahn · Anne Murphy Editors, Partition and the Practice of Memory, Palgrave MacMillan, pp. 43–62.
  “Authority, Shrines and Spaces: Scrutinizing Devotional Islam from South Asia”, in Michel Boivin and Rémy Delage (eds), Devotional Islam in Contemporary South Asia: Shrines, Journeys and Wanderers, New Delhi, Routledge, 2016, pp. 1–11.
 "The New Elite and the Issue of Sufism: A Journey from Vedanta to Theosophy in Colonial Sindh», in Dr Muhammad Ali Shaikh (compiled by), Sindh Through the century II. Proceedings of the Second International Seminar Held in Karachi in March 2014 by Sindh Madressatul Islam University, Karachi, Karachi, SMI University Press, 2015, pp. 215–231. 
 “The Saint as Ancestor in some Sufi and Ismaili Communities of the Sindhi Area”, in C. Mayeur-Jaouen & A. Papas (eds), Family Portraits with Saints. Hagiography, Sanctity, and Family in the Muslim World, Berlin, Klaus Schwarz Verlag, 2014, pp. 327–341.
 “Les Khojah et la construction de la communauté ismaélienne dans la période contemporaine : Invention de la tradition et communauté imaginée», dans Nicole Khouri et Joanna Pereira Leite (dir.), Khojas Ismaïli. Du Mozambique à la.globalisation, Paris, L’Harmattan, 2014, pp. 317–337.
 “The Isma‘ili – Isna ‘Ashari Divide Among the Khojas: Exploring Forgotten Judicial Data from Karachi”, Journal of the Royal Asiatic Society, Volume 24 / Issue 03 / July 2014, pp. 381 – 396.
 "Music and Remembrance as Meditation: Samâ` in the Indus Valley", in Halvor Eifring (Ed.), Meditation in Judaism, Christianity and Islam. Cultural Histories, London, Bloomsbury, 2013, pp. 214–224.
 "Murshid Mulan Shâh (1883-1962): A Sufi Itinerary from Sehwan Sharif in Pakistan to Haridwar in India", Oriente Moderno, XCII, 2012, 2, p. 291-312.
 "Compétition religieuse et culture partagée dans les lieux saints complexes d'Asie du sud" in Isabelle Depret et Guillaume Dye (dir.), Partage du sacré : transferts, cultes mixtes, rivalités interconfessionnelles, Bruxelles, Editions EME, 2012, pp. 149–165.
 “L’islam, l’Etat et les ulémas dans la république islamique du Pakistan. Un bras de fer de plus d’un demi-siècle”, in Christophe Jaffrelot et Aminah Mohammad-Arif, Politique et religions en Asie du sud. Le sécularisme dans tous ses états ? Paris, Editions de l’EHESS, 2012, pp. 69–92.
 “The Sufi Centre of Jhok Sharif in Pakistan (Sindh): Questioning the ziyarat as a social process” in C. Bennett & Ch. Ramsey (Ed.), South Asian Sufis: Devotion, Deviation and Destiny, Delhi, Continuum Books, 2012, pp. 95–109.
 "Devotional Literature and Sufism in the light of Nabi Bakhsh Baloch’s contribution", Journal of the Pakistan Historical Society, Vol. IX, n°4, 2011, pp. 13–22.
 “Karachi: rivalités ethniques, affrontements sectaires et compétitions politiques”, in Béatrice Giblin (dir.), Les conflits dans le monde. Approche géopolitique, Armand Colin, collection U, 2011, pp. 59–67.
 "Le qalandar et le shâh: les savoirs fakirs et leur impact sur la société du Sud Pakistan", Archives des Sciences Sociales des Religions, n°154, 2011, pp. 101–120.

Sources 
 Michel Boivin profile at EHESS
 Michel Boivin profile at the Institute for Ismaili Studies
 

Living people
21st-century French historians
French Sindhologists
Historians of Pakistan
French expatriates in Pakistan
Year of birth missing (living people)